King William County is a county located in the U.S. state of Virginia. As of the 2020 census, the population was 17,810. Its county seat is King William.

King William County is located in the Middle Peninsula and is included in the Greater Richmond Region.

History
For thousands of years before European contact, indigenous peoples of North America lived in the Tidewater area of present-day Virginia.  At the time of the founding of Jamestown, 30 Virginia Native American tribes comprised the Powhatan paramountcy, numbering 14,000-21,000 people. The Algonquian-speaking Mattaponi Indian Tribe and Upper Mattaponi tribe, among the 11 tribes recognized by the state of Virginia, are located in the county.  The Mattaponi are one of two Virginia Indian tribes who still occupy reservation land first allocated by the English under treaty in the 17th century.

One prominent family during Colonial Virginia times was that of William Aylett.  The Tobacco Inspection Act of 1730 established a tobacco inspection warehouse at Aylett's. Aylett's daughters intermarried with other Northern Neck families.

English colonists formed King William County in 1702 out of King and Queen County.  The county is named for William of Orange, King of England.  The courthouse, built in 1725, is the oldest courthouse in continuous use in the United States.

Geography
King William County is bounded by the Mattaponi River to the north and the Pamunkey River to the south. The two rivers combine to form the York River, at West Point, the county's largest town.

Adjacent counties
 Caroline County - northwest
 King and Queen County - northeast
 New Kent County - south
 Hanover County - southwest

Major Highways

Demographics

2020 census

Note: the US Census treats Hispanic/Latino as an ethnic category. This table excludes Latinos from the racial categories and assigns them to a separate category. Hispanics/Latinos can be of any race.

2010 Census
As of the 2010 United States Census, there were 15,935 people living in the county. 77.2% were White, 17.7% Black or African American, 1.4% Native American, 0.7% Asian, 0.6% of some other race and 2.3% of two or more races. 2.0% were Hispanic or Latino (of any race). 18.6% were of English, 16.5% American, 8.7% German and 7.6% Irish ancestry.

As of the census of 2000, there were 13,146 people, 4,846 households, and 3,784 families living in the county.  The population density was 48 people per square mile (18/km2).  There were 5,189 housing units at an average density of 19 per square mile (7/km2).  The racial makeup of the county was 73.81% White, 22.81% Black or African American, 1.54% Native American, 0.37% Asian, 0.33% from other races, and 1.15% from two or more races.  0.91% of the population were Hispanic or Latino of any race.

There were 4,846 households, out of which 36.40% had children under the age of 18 living with them, 63.90% were married couples living together, 10.20% had a female householder with no husband present, and 21.90% were non-families. 18.30% of all households were made up of individuals, and 7.60% had someone living alone who was 65 years of age or older.  The average household size was 2.69 and the average family size was 3.06.

In the county, the population was spread out, with 26.10% under the age of 18, 5.90% from 18 to 24, 31.50% from 25 to 44, 24.80% from 45 to 64, and 11.70% who were 65 years of age or older.  The median age was 37 years. For every 100 females, there were 96.90 males.  For every 100 females age 18 and over, there were 93.90 males.

The median income for a household in the county was $49,876, and the median income for a family was $54,037. Males had a median income of $34,616 versus $25,578 for females. The per capita income for the county was $21,928.  About 4.40% of families and 5.50% of the population were below the poverty line, including 6.00% of those under age 18 and 9.00% of those age 65 or over.

Two Indian reservations exist in the county. They are the only ones in the Commonwealth of Virginia

Government

Board of Supervisors
 First District: William L. Hodges (I)
 Second District: Travis J. Moskalski (I)
 Third District: Stephen K. Greenwood (I)
 Fourth District: C. Stuart Garber Jr. (I)
 Fifth District: Edwin H. Moren Jr. (I)

Constitutional Officers
 Clerk of the Circuit Court: Tina Glazebrook (Interim) (I)
 Commissioner of the Revenue: Karena Funkhouser (I)
 Commonwealth's Attorney: Matthew R. Kite (I)
 Sheriff: J.S. "Jeff" Walton (I)
 Treasurer: Mary Sue Bancroft (I)

King William is represented by Republican Thomas K. "Tommy" Norment, Jr. in the Virginia Senate, Republicans Scott A. Wyatt and M. Keith Hodges in the Virginia House of Delegates, and Republican Robert J. 'Rob" Wittman in the US House of Representatives.

Communities

Town
 West Point

Census-designated places
 Central Garage
 King William

Other unincorporated communities

 Aylett
 Aylett Mill
 Beulahville
 Calno
 Chericoke
 Cohoke
 Corinth Fork
 Duane
 Duane Fork
 Elsing Green
 Enfield
 Epworth
 Etna Mills
 Globe
 Gordon Landing
 Horse Landing
 Horseshoe
 Johnson Landing
 Keith
 Lanesville
 Mangohick
 Manquin
 Midway
 Pointers Landing
 Pollards Corner
 Poplar Landing
 Port Richmond
 Riverview Landing
 Romancoke
 Rosespout
 Rumford
 Scotland Landing
 Tuck Fork
 Turpin
 Upshaw
 Venter
 Wakema
 White Oak Landing
 Whitebank

See also
 National Register of Historic Places listings in King William County, Virginia

References

 
Virginia counties
1702 establishments in Virginia
Greater Richmond Region
States and territories established in 1702